Serglycin, also known as hematopoietic proteoglycan core protein or secretory granule proteoglycan core protein, is a protein that in humans is encoded by the SRGN gene. It is primarily expressed in hematopoietic cells and endothelial cells, and is the only known intracellular proteoglycan.

Function 

This gene encodes a protein best known as a hematopoietic cell granule proteoglycan. Proteoglycans stored in the secretory granules of many hematopoietic cells also contain a protease-resistant peptide core, which may be important for neutralizing hydrolytic enzymes. This encoded protein was found to be associated with the macromolecular complex of granzymes and perforin, which may serve as a mediator of granule-mediated apoptosis.

References

Further reading 

 
 
 
 
 
 
 
 
 
 
 
 
 
 
 
 
 
 
 

Proteoglycans